Burley may refer to:

People 
 Burley (surname)
 Burley Mitchell, chief justice of the North Carolina Supreme Court

Places

England 
 Burley, Hampshire, a village and civil parish
 Burley, Leeds, an inner city area of Leeds
 Burley, Rutland, a village and civil parish
 Burley, Shropshire, a location
 Burley in Wharfedale, West Yorkshire, England, a village and civil parish

United States 
 Burley, Idaho, a city
 Burley Manor, listed on the National Register of Historic Places in Maryland
 Burley, Washington, a census-designated place

Other uses 
 Burley (tobacco), grown primarily in central Kentucky and central Tennessee
 Chumming (burley or berley in Australasia), the practice of luring various animals, usually pelagic predatory fish, by throwing meat-based groundbaits into the water
 Burley Design, an American company
 Re Burley, a Canadian court decision

See also
 Burley Woodhead, a hamlet in West Yorkshire, England
 Burley-Sekem, a brand of leather ball
 Birley (disambiguation)
 Burghley (disambiguation)
 Burleigh (disambiguation)
 Berlei